Ras-related protein Rab-35 is a protein that in humans is encoded by the RAB35 gene. This GTPase participates in the traffic of recycling endosomes toward the plasma membrane,

References

Further reading